Grand Hotel is the sixth studio album by Procol Harum. Released in 1973, it signalled a change of direction for the band. Guitarist Dave Ball, who had joined the band for their live album the previous year, left shortly after the photo shoot for the proposed album's cover, to be replaced by Mick Grabham. Grabham's head was superimposed on the front and back cover of the album on Ball's body. Although the band had gone through significant personnel changes in previous years, the band would enter its most stable phase with this lineup.

The album reached No. 21 on the Billboard album charts. It peaked at #4 in Denmark, where the group was always well received.

Although Grand Hotel appears on the surface to be a concept album, the "concept", according to lyricist Keith Reid, doesn't extend beyond the title tune.

The single "A Souvenir of London" was banned by the BBC for the reference to venereal disease in its lyrics. Reid claimed that the song was really inspired (regardless of how it turned out and was interpreted) by a visit to a souvenir shop near George Martin's Air Studios. "Almost every album has had at least one comic song...and this one was a bit tongue in cheek" Reid stated as part of an interview for the 2009 CD reissue.

Critical reception 

Reviewing for Rolling Stone in 1973, Bud Scoppa called Grand Hotel a "confused and uneven transitional album" and "a collection of overblown production jobs that, at their worst, approach self-parody, and simpler, less grandiose tracks that suggest Procol Harum may yet find a way out of the corner they have worked themselves into." Village Voice critic Robert Christgau similarly noted the split in musical identity: "For years, these guys have vacillated between a menu of grits that certainly ain't groceries and larks' tongues in aspic. Despite their current white-tie conceit, they still haven't decided."

In a retrospective review, AllMusic's James A. Gardner gave the album three-and-a-half out of five stars and said the replacement of the band's original guitarist Robin Trower with the "capable, even powerful, but not nearly as distinctive" Mick Grabham resulted in a greater reliance on "ornate arrangements than guitar riffs, making this somewhat more dignified than either of their previous studio albums, Home and Broken Barricades."

2009 Salvo reissue
In 2009 Salvo reissued the CD remastered by Nick Robbins. Vocalist/keyboardist/composer Gary Brooker and lyricist Keith Reid supplemented the original CD with two bonus tracks. Both were "raw" tracks; i.e., they did not feature overdubs. One of the bonus tracks, "Bringing Home the Bacon", is the only one to feature former guitarist Dave Ball. The 2009 reissue also featured an essay by Patrick Humphries and was reissued in a cardboard sleeve.

Record Store Day UK 2021 release
A newly remastered limited edition vinyl LP of Grand Hotel was released on Record Store Day UK, 12 June 2021 on the Esoteric Recordings label. This release was limited to 1000 copies in 180g white vinyl. Newly remastered from the original master tapes and cut at Abbey Road Studios, it has a gatefold sleeve and facsimile of the original lyric book.

Track listing

Charts

Personnel
Procol Harum
 Gary Brooker – vocals, piano
 Mick Grabham – guitar
 Chris Copping – organ
 Alan Cartwright – bass guitar, acoustic bass 
 B.J. Wilson – drums, percussion 
 Keith Reid – lyrics
with:
 Christiane Legrand – vocals (8)
 The Pahene Recorder Ensemble – guest appearance (6)
Technical
John Punter – engineer
Spencer Zahn – artwork, design
Jeffrey Weisel – photography, drawings in internal booklet

Certifications
United Kingdom-Silver

Legacy
Douglas Adams claimed that the idea for The Restaurant at the End of the Universe was inspired by the title track, "which he wanted to run throughout the whole Milliways section" (of the original BBC Radio series of The Hitch Hiker's Guide to the Galaxy). However, according to the show's producer, Geoffrey Perkins, "Douglas was unable to explain clearly what connection it actually had" with the concept and so the idea was abandoned.

References

External links
 ProcolHarum.com – ProcolHarum.com's page on this album

Procol Harum albums
1973 albums
Albums produced by Chris Thomas (record producer)
Chrysalis Records albums
Repertoire Records albums